Dimitri Lionel Uy Limbo (born 17 November 1998), known as Troy Limbo, is a Filipino professional footballer who plays as a midfielder for Philippines Football League club Stallion Laguna.

Early career

Youth
Limbo first started playing football at the age of six, at the Rosevale School in his native Philippines. He played for the Little Azkals team in 2011, having left the Rosevale School for the Abbas Orchard School. After studying at La Salle Green Hills, and playing for Kaya in 2015, Limbo moved to England to pursue a football career.

Having not been able to find any clubs to go on trial with, he signed with a local team in Stamford, before being scouted by League One side Chesterfield. He signed a 12-month contract in 2016.

College
Prior to returning to the Philippines, Limbo studied at the Sunderland College, playing for their football team. During his time at the college, he was called up the Philippines national under-23 side.

Club career

Sunderland RCA
During his time in England, he also played for Sunderland RCA.

Azkals Development Team
In 2020, Limbo joined Philippines Football League club Azkals Development Team. He made his league debut for the club in a 0–1 defeat against his former club Kaya–Iloilo.

Stallion Laguna
In March 2022, he joined Stallion Laguna.

International career

Philippines U19
In 2015, Limbo was called up to the Philippines U19 team for the 2015 AFF U-19 Youth Championship held at Laos National Stadium, Vientiane, Laos. He made his debut for Philippines U-19 in a 1−2 win against Brunei U19.

Philippines U22/U23
In 2017, Limbo received his first call up to the Philippines U22 team for the 2017 Southeast Asian Games in Malaysia. He made his debut for Philippines U22 in a 0−2 win against Cambodia U22.

Career statistics

Club

Notes

References

External links
 

1998 births
Living people
Filipino footballers
Philippines youth international footballers
Association football midfielders
Philippines Football League players
Kaya F.C. players
Chesterfield F.C. players
Azkals Development Team players
Filipino expatriate footballers
Expatriate footballers in England